See the Light is the second album by American singer Bo Bice, released on October 23, 2007 by Sugarmoney/StratArt.

Background
Bice's debut album, The Real Thing, was with RCA.  After parting ways with RCA, according to BoBice.com, he signed with the indie label $ugarmoney/StratArt, a partnership between Bo and the label of Strategic Artist Management, his management company.  The album was released as a Wal-Mart exclusive.

Bice stated about the sound of "See the Light" that:

"It's a star-studded cast, and I'm the only one on there who's not famous," the ever-humble Bice joked. "I picked and co-wrote the songs that if I was a guy who would be spending my hard-earned money buying an album I would want to hear." That means original back-to-basics Southern rock and country-tinged singer/songwriter tunes co-written with A.J. Croce (son of 1970s singer Jim Croce) and Chris Tompkins (Carrie Underwood's "Before He Cheats").

Bice also stated that he wrote thirty-one songs for the album and narrowed it down between ten and twelve songs. The songs will feature session performances by classic and southern rock luminaries keyboardist Chuck Leavell, The Black Crowes’s drummer Steve Gorman, and guitarist Waddy Wachtel (who has worked with just about everyone, including The Rolling Stones, Bryan Ferry, Stevie Nicks and Bob Seger).

Track listing
All songs written by Bo Bice, except where noted.

Track listing

Personnel
Performance credits
 Bo Bice- Primary artist, guitar, dobro, harmonica, 12 string guitar, mandolin, background vocals
 Phillip Shouse- Guitar, background vocals
 Glenn Worf- Bass
 Steve Gorman- Drums
 Thomas Lee- Keyboard
 Miles McPherson- Percussion
 Dan Dugmore- Lap steel, mandolin
 Ike Bartley- Saxophone
 Patrick Mitchell- Background vocals
 Raquel Wynn- Background vocals
 Carol Chase- Background vocals
 Vicki Hampton- Background vocals
 Shandra Penix- Background vocals
 Chuck Leavell - Keyboards
 Waddy Wachtel - Guitar

Technical credits
 Bo Bice- Producer
 Frank Liddell- Producer
 Mike Wrucke- Producer, engineer
 John Beard - Engineer
 Eric Tonkin - Assistant engineer
 Louie Teran - Mastering
 Strategic Artist Management - Management
 Mary Ann McCready - Management
 Julie Boos - Management
 Joey Lee - Agency

Chart performance
See the Light's chart performance reached a number of 150 in the US. As of October 14, 2008 it had sold 61,000+ copies.

Release history

References

2007 albums
Albums produced by Frank Liddell
Bo Bice albums